He loves me, he loves me not or She loves me, she loves me not (originally effeuiller la marguerite in French) is a game of French origin, in which one person seeks to determine whether the object of their affection returns that affection.

A person playing the game alternately speaks the phrases "He (or she) loves me," and "He loves me not," while picking one petal off a flower (usually an ox-eye daisy) for each phrase. The phrase they speak on picking off the last petal supposedly represents the truth between the object of their affection loving them or not. The player typically is motivated by attraction to the person they are speaking of while reciting the phrases. They may seek to reaffirm a pre-existing belief, or act out of whimsy.

In the original French version of the game, the petals do not simply indicate whether the object of the player's affection loves them, but to what extent: un peu or "a little", beaucoup or "a lot", passionnément or "passionately", à la folie or "to madness", or pas du tout or "not at all."

A humorous twist on the game is "He loves me, he loves me lots."

In Part 1 of Goethe's Faust, Gretchen engages in the game. (1808) 

This fortune-telling is shown as a pantomime in the 1st act of Giselle, ballet by Jean Coralli and Jules Perrot (Paris, 1841).

References 
  The French at Home: A Nation's Character, Culture and Genius as Observed by an American Diplomat, Albert Rhodes, 1875 (republished 2005)
  effeuiller la marguerite - Cambridge French-English Thesaurus by Marie-Noëlle Lamy, Richard Towell, 1998
 effeuiller la marguerite - Webster's New World Concise French Dictionary
 Book references (English language search on Google Books)
 Book references (French language search on Google Books)

French games
Children's games
English phrases